Ethmia zebrata is a moth in the family Depressariidae. It is found in Mexico.

References

Moths described in 1959
zebrata